Family with sequence similarity 71 member B is a protein that in humans is encoded by the FAM71B gene.

References

Further reading